William Bray (1879 – 1960) was a New Zealand cricketer. He played in five first-class matches for Wellington from 1914 to 1921.

See also
 List of Wellington representative cricketers

References

External links
 

1879 births
1960 deaths
New Zealand cricketers
Wellington cricketers